Isocitrate—homoisocitrate dehydrogenase is an enzyme that catalyzes the following two reactions:
 isocitrate + NAD+  2-oxoglutarate + CO2 + NADH
 homoisocitrate + NAD+  2-oxoadipate + CO2 + NADH + H+

References 

 

EC 1.1.1